The Watchers is a 1960 bronze sculpture by the British sculptor Lynn Chadwick depicting three abstracted figures whose form is inspired by the Moai. 

Four castings were made: these are currently on display in the San Diego Museum of Art's May S. Marcy Sculpture Garden, Roehampton University in London, Loughborough University and Ursinus College, Pennsylvania.

Theft and recasting of figure 
One of the three figures at Roehampton University was stolen in 2006, possibly to be sold as scrap metal. The remaining figures were placed into storage shortly afterwards. In 2014, the University obtained permission from Chadwick's estate to recast the missing figure and the sculpture was returned to its original location in full.

See also
 1960 in art
 List of public art in the London Borough of Wandsworth
 Bull (by Robert Clatworthy), another sculpture on the Alton Estate, London

References

External Links 

 Loughborough University Sculpture Collection

1960 sculptures
Abstract sculptures in California
Abstract sculptures in the United Kingdom
Bronze sculptures in California
Grade II listed buildings in the London Borough of Wandsworth
Outdoor sculptures in San Diego
Sculptures of the San Diego Museum of Art
Stolen works of art